Marcel Petran (born 16 September 1986) is a Slovak professional ice hockey defenceman. He is currently a free agent.

Petran made his professional debut for MHk 32 Liptovský Mikuláš in 2006. He later played in the MOL Liga for Újpesti TE, the Kazakhstan Hockey Championship for Arlan Kokshetau and the Elite Ice Hockey League for the Edinburgh Capitals before returning to Slovakia on August 9, 2015 with HC '05 Banská Bystrica.

On June 24, 2016, Petran moved to the Czech Republic to sign for AZ Havířov of the WSM Liga. On October 8, 2017, Petran had a loan spell with PSG Berani Zlín of the Czech Extraliga, playing twenty games and registering one assist. He would return to Slovakia two months later to sign for HK Poprad.

Petran made a return to Liptovský Mikuláš after eight years away on July 18. 2019. He then moved to HKM Zvolen on February 10, 2020 for the remainder of the season though the season would be prematurely concluded due to the COVID-19 pandemic. He returned to Liptovský Mikuláš on August 5, 2020.

Career statistics

Regular season and playoffs

References

External links

 

1986 births
Slovak ice hockey defencemen
Sportspeople from Liptovský Mikuláš
Living people
MHk 32 Liptovský Mikuláš players
HC Prešov players
Újpesti TE (ice hockey) players
Basingstoke Bison players
Bracknell Bees players
Arlan Kokshetau players
Peterborough Phantoms players
Edinburgh Capitals players
HC '05 Banská Bystrica players
AZ Havířov players
PSG Berani Zlín players
HK Poprad players
HKM Zvolen players
HC Košice players
MsHK Žilina players
Slovak expatriate sportspeople in England
Slovak expatriate sportspeople in Hungary
Slovak expatriate sportspeople in Scotland
Slovak expatriate sportspeople in Kazakhstan
Slovak expatriate ice hockey players in the Czech Republic
Expatriate ice hockey players in Kazakhstan
Expatriate ice hockey players in Hungary
Expatriate ice hockey players in England
Expatriate ice hockey players in Scotland